The PBA Tour is the major professional tour for ten-pin bowling, operated by the Professional Bowlers Association. Headquartered in Chicago, Illinois, over 3,000 members worldwide make up the PBA. While most of the PBA members are Regional professionals, a small percentage of the bowling membership competes at the national and international level, forming the PBA Tour. (PBA.com lists 75 bowlers that have national touring pro status as of the start of the 2023 season.) Founded in 1958, the PBA Tour has been in continuous operation since the inaugural 1959 season.

Each year, the PBA Tour puts on a series of events for PBA members. Most events are held across the United States, with the PBA co-sponsoring selected international events as part of the World Bowling Tour (WBT). In addition, the PBA Tour co-hosts the Round1 Japan Cup along with the Japan Professional Bowling Association (JPBA). Also, select American members compete against their European counterparts in the Weber Cup.

Qualifying for the PBA Tour

From the PBA Tour's inception through the 2003–04 season, most national PBA Tour events were open to the entire PBA membership. The initial tournament squads typically included well over 100 bowlers, who would bowl a set number of qualifying games to determine the "cut line" for additional qualifying and/or match play (typically 64 bowlers).

The Exempt Tour (2004–05 through 2011–12)

Starting in October 2004, the PBA adopted an all-exempt national tour format. In this format, only 64 bowlers competed in most weekly events.  Bowlers earned exemptions by winning a tournament during the previous season, winning one of the four major tournaments (thus gaining a multi-year exemption), placing among the top finishers in points, leading a region on the PBA Regional Tour (2005–2007), finishing in a high position at the PBA Tour Trials (2005–2008), or placing high enough at the PBA Regional Players Invitational Tournament (2008–2011).

Under this new format, bona fide status as a touring professional was not a guarantee; it had to be earned. The 2005 H&R Block Tournament of Champions was pivotal, as Randy Pedersen was facing the loss of his exempt status in the semi-final match against Norm Duke. On his final shot, Pedersen left a weak 7-pin and immediately singled out the sidelines, accusing a spectator of distracting him as he made his shot.  From that point, Pedersen would have to bowl in the Tour Qualifying Round (TQR) in order to try making the initial field of 64.

Criticism of the format was brought forth by long-time PBA fans when popular 24-time winner Brian Voss lost his tour exemption following the 2006–07 season.  19-time titlist Amleto Monacelli also lost his exemption at the same time.

Depending on the season, a set number of bowlers (for example, 58 bowlers in the 2008–09 season) earned exemptions which automatically placed them in the starting field of 64 bowlers each week. The remaining spots needed to bring the field to 64 were awarded each week through the PBA Tour Qualifying Round (TQR), also called the "rabbit squad". PBA Commissioner Fred Schreyer would often award one spot in the field to a former touring pro under the Commissioner's Exemption, meaning even fewer spots were available via the TQR.  For example, PBA Hall of Famer and Medford, Oregon resident Marshall Holman competed on a Commissioner's Exemption at the Bayer Earl Anthony Medford Classic held in that city in January 2009.

During the TQR, amateur and non-exempt PBA bowlers bowled 7 games of qualifying.  The top amateur bowler advanced (no matter where he or she finished), along with the top-scoring PBA members needed to round out the field. In the 2007–08 PBA season, rookie Rhino Page made a remarkable five TV finals appearances (winning one title) despite having to bowl in the TQR every week.

Qualifying via PBA Tour Trials and RPI

From 2005 to 2008, the PBA held the PBA Tour Trials in late May/early June to determine the bowlers who would will fill the remaining open spots on the following season's exempt player list.  The number of exemptions awarded at the PBA Tour Trials varied—10 spots were available in 2006–07, but only seven spots at the start of the 2007–08 and 2008–09 campaigns.  That number could increase or decrease due to injury deferments for currently exempt bowlers. At the Tour Trials, non-exempt PBA and international bowlers bowled nine games each day for five straight days on the five primary PBA oil patterns. (See "PBA Tour lane preparation" later in this article.)

At the 2006 Denny's PBA Tour Trials, Kelly Kulick made history by becoming the first woman to ever gain a PBA exemption (she was exempt for the 2006–07 season).  (Before it dissolved, Kulick was the 2001 Rookie of the Year on the PWBA, won the 2003 U.S. Women's Open, and was a three-time member of Team USA.) Kulick later earned a two-year exemption to the main PBA Tour with her victory in the 2010 Tournament of Champions; she had earned her spot in that event by winning the PBA Women's World Championship, the tour's first major championship in its Women's Series.

From 2009 to 2011, the Tour Trials were replaced by the PBA Regional Players Invitational (RPI).  For the 2010–11 and 2011–12 seasons, the top eight finishers at the RPI were offered PBA Tour exemptions, though not all of them accepted. At the 2011 RPI, 58-year-old Kerry Painter finished eighth and made history by becoming the oldest player to ever earn a PBA Tour exemption.

Exempt Tour discontinued (2012–13 and beyond)

In November 2011, the PBA announced that they would discontinue the exempt tour format for the 2012–13 PBA Tour season.  Due to the changing climate of the Tour itself, the number of all-exempt events had been steadily declining in the 2009–10 and 2010–11 seasons, until there were only three exempt events for the 2011–12 season. This change meant that all but two events during the 2012–13 PBA national tour were open to all players.

The two notable exceptions to the open policy are the PBA Tournament of Champions (TOC) and the Round1 Japan Cup. The TOC accepts only the most recent 48 PBA Tour titlists (with a "Touring 1" or "Touring 2" status), plus past winners of the TOC itself. The Japan Cup invites the top sixteen PBA Tour bowlers (based on final points standing of the previous season), and four at-large PBA Tour players selected by the tournament committee.

While the "exempt player" designation was removed, the PBA announced that players would be able to earn "Touring 1" and "Touring 2" statuses, which will offer certain benefits and bonuses. "Touring 1" status is awarded to all bowlers who enter at least 80 percent of a season's tournaments, including the World Series of Bowling, at least two majors, and at least three PBA Xtra Frame events. "Touring 2" status is awarded for players entering at least 60 percent of a season's tournaments, including the World Series, at least one major, and at least one Xtra Frame event. To earn either status, players must also average 190 or higher in PBA Tour events.

While the PBA points list no longer affects exempt status, there are incentives for finishing high on the list — such as eligibility for certain tournaments like the PBA Players Championship (begun in 2011–12), PBA Tour Finals (begun in 2017) and PBA Playoffs (begun in 2019).

Finals formats
Prior to the debut of the PBA on ABC television in 1962, most tournaments were organized where, once the cut was established after qualifying rounds, a set number of match-play games were bowled, and bonus pins were given to the winner of each match. The champion was then decided based on the final overall total pinfall.

From 1962 to 1965, ABC started televising the PBA Tour, starting with a limited number of tournaments on ABC's Wide World of Sports, and later having its own timeslot. Therefore, a round-robin tournament format was implemented to determine the champion. The televised finals would be cut to the top four bowlers after match-play, and then three round-robin matches between the fourth, third and second-seeded bowlers would determine the final two bowlers. If any bowler were to win both of his matches in the round-robin, he would go on to face the tournament leader. If the three bowlers each split their matches to go 1 and 1 in the round-robin, total pinfall would decide which man would advance to the final match to face the tournament leader. The winner of the final match would win the tournament.

From the late 1960s to 1997 (with the exception of one year), televised events were done in a "stepladder" format. Four matches would be held, with the #5 and #4 seeds from the qualifying rounds meeting first. The winner of the first match would bowl the #3 seed, and likewise up to the top spot.

ABC experimented in 1993 with a King Of The Hill format.  Under this arrangement, only the top four seeds made it to the television finals, instead of five, with the traditional stepladder format. The #4 and #3 seeds met first, with the winner facing the #2 seed, and that winner then facing the #1 seed. The winner of the tournament faced the current "King" for an additional cash prize. The winner of the King of the Hill match would then bowl the winner of the following week's tournament. The "King" could defend his title even when not competing in the event hosting it.  The tour resumed its normal "stepladder" format the following year.

The bowler who won himself the most notoriety for winning "King" matches was Ron Williams, who won only four tourneys in his career, yet held the "King" spot for five consecutive weeks that year.

Special formats were also used on occasion in conjunction with Old Spice deodorant, which sponsored a Winning Never Gets Old challenge annually in the mid-1990s. The winner of the championship would bowl a Seniors Tour bowler for the rights to an extra $10,000.

When the PBA Tour moved to CBS in 1998, a two-match format was adopted. Again going to four bowlers, the #2, #3, and #4 players bowled in one "shootout" match, with the winner facing the tournament's #1 qualifier for the championship.  From 1998 to 2000, also, the PBA used gold-colored pins with black stripes or crowns (depending on if Brunswick or AMF was involved in the alley) for their televised finals.  The pins returned to regular white in 2001.

When the PBA Tour introduced the World Series of Bowling during the 2009–10 season, the televised finals for all tournaments in the series used the four-man stepladder format. During the 2011 WSOB, an "eliminator" format was used. The top four qualifiers all bowled together, and the top three scorers would move on to the next match, with the lowest score finishing in fourth place. The next match would then take the two top scorers (low score finishing in third place), and these two bowlers competed head-to-head in the final match. Starting in 2012, the WSOB switched back to the four-man stepladder format, with the exception of the PBA World Championship which featured a five-man stepladder final.

The Road to the Finals

After the PBA's sale and move of broadcasts to ESPN, most tournaments used a "bracketed" format. Each bowler bowled nine qualifying games, with the top 64 by pinfall competing in best 4-of-7 head-to-head matches.  The four remaining bowlers from match play competed in two semi-final matches (#4 seed vs. #1 seed, and #3 seed vs. #2 seed), followed by a final match of the semi-final winners.  A few tournaments still used the stepladder format for the finals.

In January 2005, the PBA tournament format was modified because of the all exempt tour. Non-exempt bowlers bowled on the first day to determine the additional six (or more) bowlers who qualify for the tournament (on top of the exempt field).  The second day consisted of 64 bowlers rolling 14 games (two 7-game blocks) to determine the 32 bowlers who made "match play" on the third day.  Seeding of the top 32 was based on a rolling points list of the 20 previous events.

The third day featured 32 bowlers competing in potentially 21 matches in a single day. It started with the first round in the morning, followed by the second round ("Round of 16") after lunch.  That night, the quarterfinal ("Round of 8") matches were conducted.  All matches were a best 4-of-7 format.  The four quarterfinal winners made the field for the televised finals.  Depending on the finals format, a fifth bowler could be added based on highest pinfall among the quarterfinal non-winners.

The championship round remained single head-to-head matches for semifinals and finals on the final day. Beginning in the 2009–10 season, a majority of the finals had returned to the stepladder format.

2009–10 changes

For the first five exempt events of the 2009–10 season, the starting field consisted of 72 bowlers all rolling 14 games of qualifying in one day (two blocks of 7 games each) to determine the top 28.  The top four bowlers by pinfall automatically earned a spot in the Round of 16 match play.  The other 12 spots for the Round of 16 were determined in a separate match play round for the #5 through #28 seeds.  The eight winners from the Round of 16 match play then bowled a final match play round to determine the four bowlers who advanced to the TV finals.

All match play rounds were on the second day of the tournament, and all were best 4-of-7 matches.

Top 20 in PBA titles
The following are the top titles winners in PBA Tour history. The table lists the name and the number of titles. Players who are:

 Members still active on the regular PBA Tour are highlighted in blue background.
 Deceased members are highlighted in gray background.
 Members still alive but retired from the regular PBA Tour are highlighted in red background.

All players listed are members of the PBA Hall of Fame, except Jason Belmonte and E. J. Tackett. Belmonte and Tackett are title-eligible, but have not yet met the years-on-tour requirement.

In May 2008, the PBA announced that it was revising its all-time records to include USBC Masters and BPAA All-Star titles if they were bowled by a PBA member.  American Bowling Congress (the merger took place in 2005) Masters titles prior to 1998 and BPAA All-Star (U.S. Open prior to 1971) titles were previously not counted as PBA titles. The events bowled in the PBA era (since 1959) are now counted as both a PBA title and a major title. The most significant impact of this change is that Dick Weber moves from a 10th place tie on the all-time titles list to 7th place (30 titles) while picking up four more majors (all BPAA All-Star events). Also, Earl Anthony is credited with two more major titles, both being USBC Masters, giving him ten majors among his 43 total titles.  Pete Weber tied Anthony with ten major titles after his win in the 2013 PBA Tournament of Champions. Both players were surpassed by Jason Belmonte, who won his record 11th major title in 2019 and now owns 14 majors.

Player of the Year
The PBA Player of the Year began being officially recognized in 1963. It was awarded by The Sporting News from 1963–70, and by the PBA membership from 1971–2007. Some factors used in the voting process for a given season included major titles, total titles, Tour average ranking, points ranking, season earnings and TV finals appearances. In 1999, the award was officially renamed the Chris Schenkel PBA Player of the Year, in honor of the legendary broadcaster who covered bowling on national television for 35 years.

Billy Hardwick was the first bowler to be awarded an official PBA Player of the Year honor, and is also the youngest (22) to ever win the award. The mid-1970s to early-1980s were dominated by Earl Anthony and Mark Roth.  The two won 10 of the 11 P.O.Y. awards between 1974 and 1984, and faced off in many memorable finals. Walter Ray Williams Jr. and Jason Belmonte have won the most P.O.Y. awards (7 each), one more than Anthony. Williams is also the oldest bowler to be named Player of the Year, earning the 2009–10 award at age 50.

In the 2007–08 season, a new Player of the Year system was instituted, where a points system only determined the winner.  Chris Barnes became the first Player of the Year winner under this new system in 2008, edging out Walter Ray Williams Jr. by two points. The points-only system lasted just three seasons, and by the 2010–11 season, a player vote was again part of the process.

PBA Tour lane preparation
Unlike the typical "league condition" or "house shot", which facilitates a fairly consistent pattern and wider target area, the PBA rotates several challenging lane oil patterns throughout the season.  The initial named patterns  — known as Cheetah, Viper, Scorpion, Shark and Chameleon — feature varying oil volumes and lengths that require pros to adjust ball angle, rotation and speed accordingly.  On some patterns, certain "strike lines" (areas of the lane) are unplayable, and spare shooting becomes much more important.  This means a 220 average on the PBA Tour would easily translate to 20-30 pins higher on a typical league shot.

To put this theory to the test, the PBA held a special "Ultimate Scoring Championship" in the 2008–09 season, with pro bowlers competing on a typical league lane condition. The event took place November 9–11, 2008 in Taylor, Michigan, prior to the PBA Chameleon Championship that took place in the same bowling center. The lane conditions indeed proved easier for the professionals, as three of the four finalists averaged better than 250 during match play.

Custom oil patterns are used for the four major tournaments. In addition, the PBA introduced the Dick Weber pattern for two 2008–09 tournaments (including the Denny's Dick Weber Open), plus a newly designed "Earl" pattern for the Earl Anthony Medford Classic. Beginning in the 2018 season, the PBA began incorporating several more "legends" oil patterns (e.g., Mark Roth 42, Carmen Salvino 44, etc.) in addition to the Weber, Anthony and "animal" oil patterns.

Though most PBA pros tend to bowl their best on one or two of the PBA oil patterns, two players, Mika Koivuniemi and Tommy Jones, have managed to win at least one title on all five of the standard "animal" patterns.

The USBC is also grasping the PBA lane conditions. Called the USBC PBA Experience, amateurs are able to experience and test their bowling skills against PBA-like conditions, by participating in a USBC sanctioned league style called Sport Bowling.

For the 2013 World Series of Bowling and into the 2014 season, the PBA began using lane oil that is dyed blue for televised matches, thus helping viewers not only see the pattern layout but also see how the play area changes from game to game. Said ESPN Coordinating Producer Kathy Cook, "Until now, one of the most crucial and least understood aspects of the game was invisible."

The shortest pattern used in the 2019 PBA Tour season was the 32-foot Wolf pattern, and the longest was the 48-foot Shark pattern.

2009 and later PBA Tour season changes

2009–10 World Series of Bowling

In a cost-cutting effort, the PBA split the 2009–10 season into two segments.  The first, the 2009 World Series of Bowling, consisted of seven PBA Tour events—including one major tournament (PBA World Championship) – held in August and September 2009 in Allen Park, MI, near Detroit.  All of the events ran in a split format: the early rounds of each tournament were held on consecutive days in August and September, and ESPN television taped the final rounds for the tournaments on Labor Day weekend (September 5–7). These were aired on seven Sundays, October 25 through December 6, 2009.

The final rounds for the Women's and Senior PBA World Championship were taped September 5 and were broadcast on October 25.  The final round for the "open" PBA World Championship was broadcast live on December 13.

The Motor City Open and PBA World Championship were open to the entire PBA membership.  The fields for the five exempt events were increased from 64 to 72, with the additional spots going to TQR qualifiers and the new "Golden Parachute" entry reserved for a formerly-exempt player.  Under the Golden Parachute rule, any formerly exempt PBA member who lost his/her exemption during past four years was able to apply for this new exempt position. (It was awarded to 24-time PBA titlist Brian Voss.) Following the 2009–10 season, the Golden Parachute exemption will come only from the previous year's crop of players who lose their exemption due to points.

The exempt PBA Women's Series fields were increased from 16 to 20.  The Women's Series added qualifiers for the exempt events to fill two of the four additional spots.

The second half of the season, running  January–April 2010, consisted of 11 traditional touring weekly tournaments, including the remaining three majors. Each event ended with the live ESPN television finals on Sundays.  The second half also included three special (non-title) televised events: the Chris Paul PBA Celebrity Invitational, the PBA Experience Showdown, and the PBA Women's Series Showdown.

2010–11 season

The PBA announced in May, 2010 that it would again cover all of the Fall tournaments for the upcoming season at the World Series of Bowling.  The second annual event was held October 24 through November 6, 2010 at South Point Hotel, Casino and Bowling Center in Las Vegas, Nevada.  It consisted of five title events, qualifying for the PBA World Championship, and one non-title, made-for-TV event.  Based on input from players, as well as corporate partner and ESPN television needs, there were some revisions to the series:

 All events were "open," meaning any PBA member could enter the entire World Series of Bowling via $750 entry fee.  There were no Tour Qualifying Rounds or "World Series Trials."
 Over the first five days (starting October 25) all players bowled 12 games on each of the PBA's five "animal" oil patterns (Cheetah, Chameleon, Viper, Scorpion and Shark). The Top 16 qualifiers on each pattern advanced to a 9-game match play the following week. Top 5 qualifiers after the match play rounds in each event advanced to the televised stepladder finals, contested on November 5–6 and taped by ESPN for broadcasts on five consecutive Sundays, starting November 28.
 The standings after all 60 animal pattern qualifying games also determined the rankings for the PBA World Championship.  The World Championship was again be the first major and first live ESPN broadcast of the season, but this time it featured the Top 8 qualifiers bowling over three consecutive days (January 14–16, 2011).
 The Top 6 U.S. qualifiers and Top 6 International qualifiers after the 60 animal pattern games competed in a special (non-title) televised event called "USA vs. The World," which was taped on November 6 for a January 9, 2011 broadcast.

The format for the second half of the 2010–11 season included the remaining three majors (USBC Masters, Tournament of Champions and U.S. Open), as well as the first-ever Dick Weber PBA Playoffs.  The 2011 Tournament of Champions had the largest prize fund ($1 million U.S.) and largest first-place prize ($250,000 U.S.) in PBA history.

2011–12 season

The PBA announced in June 2011 that it would again cover all of the Fall tournaments for the upcoming season at the World Series of Bowling, and that the event would have a $1 million prize fund.  The event was held November 4–20, 2011 and returned to the South Point Hotel, Casino and Bowling Center in Las Vegas, Nevada. It included both the qualifying and final rounds of the PBA World Championship, the first major tournament of the season.

The second half of the PBA Tour season includes the three remaining majors (USBC Masters, Lumber Liquidators U.S. Open and Tournament of Champions), plus four additional title events.

2012–13 season

The PBA announced in June, 2012 that the 2012–13 PBA season would include an unprecedented 40 title events.  The season began in November, 2012 with the 2012 World Series of Bowling and concluded with a second World Series of Bowling starting in November, 2013. There were 15 international stops on the 2012–13 tour, which are now counted as PBA titles if won by a full-fledged PBA member.  The 14-month season was done in preparation for a return to a calendar year national tour format in 2014. The PBA had not had a calendar year format since the 2000 season. The PBA also abandoned its "exempt player" tour format prior to this season.

2017–18: BPAA partnership
On June 22, 2017, the PBA announced a partnership with the Bowling Proprietors Association of America (BPAA) and that organization's website GoBowling.com, noting that the PBA Tour from December 2017 through July 2018 will be renamed the Go Bowling! PBA Tour. There was an option for the partnership to be extended to additional Tour seasons.

2019: Acquisition by Bowlero Corporation
In September 2019, the PBA and PBA Tour were purchased by Bowlero Corporation. Colie Edison, Bowlero's former Customer Service Officer, was named CEO of the PBA. Tom Clark was retained as PBA Commissioner.

PBA Tour major championships
The PBA Tour has five events that have been considered major tournaments over the history of the organization:

 The USBC Masters
 The PBA World Championship
 The Tournament of Champions
 The U.S. Open
 The PBA Players Championship

USBC Masters

Current defending champion: Anthony Simonsen

 The USBC Masters became an officially sanctioned PBA event in 1998. (Prior to the 2005 merger of the ABC and WIBC, this event was known as the ABC Masters.)
 Lee Jouglard became the first Masters champion with his win in the inaugural event in 1951.
 Entrants for the USBC Masters can qualify via sanctioned USBC league play and are not required to be PBA members. Winners do, however, have to be full-fledged PBA members to be credited with a PBA title.
 PBA Hall of Famer Ernie Schlegel became the oldest player to win a PBA Tour major, winning the 1996 USBC Masters at age 53.
 The televised final round for the 2004 Masters was held at Miller Park, home of Major League Baseball's Milwaukee Brewers. Danny Wiseman won the title in front of over 4,000 fans.
 Walter Ray Williams Jr. won a memorable 2009–10 Masters at age 50, firing a 290 game in the final to defeat Chris Barnes. Buzz Fazio was previously the oldest player to ever win a Masters title, when he won the 1955 event at age 47.
 With victories in both the 2013 and 2014 tournaments, Jason Belmonte became the first person to win back-to-back USBC Masters titles since Billy Welu in 1964–65. On February 8, 2015, Belmonte became the first player in history to win three consecutive USBC Masters championships. Mike Aulby is the only other player to win three Masters titles, but Aulby's wins were not in consecutive seasons.
 Jason Belmonte holds the most USBC Masters wins at four (2013, 2014, 2015, and 2017).
 Anthony Simonsen won the 2016 USBC Masters, becoming the youngest person (19 years, 39 days) to ever win a PBA major. That distinction previously belonged to Mike Aulby, who won the 1979 PBA National Championship at age 19 years, 83 days.

Note: In May 2008, the PBA announced that it was revising its all-time records to include ABC Masters wins in the PBA era prior to 1998 as PBA major titles, if the person who earned the title was a PBA member at the time. One notable result of this change is that Earl Anthony's long-standing 41 career titles count was increased to 43, as he had won the 1977 and 1984 Masters events.

PBA World Championship

Current defending champion:  Kristopher Prather

 Originally the PBA National Championship, this event was renamed the PBA World Championship in 2002–03.
 The PBA World Championship is a PBA members-only event.
 Don Carter won the inaugural National Championship in 1960 in Memphis, TN, defeating Ronnie Gaudern.
 Hall of Famer Wayne Zahn became the first bowler to win this event twice, defeating Nelson Burton Jr. both times.
 Earl Anthony staked his mastery in this event; twice capturing it three straight years (1973–75; 1981–83).  His 1983 victory was his 41st title (under PBA rules at the time), a record that would stand until Walter Ray Williams Jr. broke it in 2006–07.
 Fellow Hall of Famer Mike Aulby won this event in 1979, the first of his 29 PBA titles.  Ironically, he had to defeat Anthony to win.
 The following year, Johnny Petraglia won the final of his 14 titles at the Sterling Heights, MI, event.  Petraglia became the second bowler to win bowling's original "Triple Crown" with this victory (after Billy Hardwick).
 A memorable 1994 PBA National featured brothers David Traber and Dale Traber squaring off in the final match, with David emerging victorious.
 With his runner-up finish in the February 2008 event, Ryan Shafer set a record with his fourth runner-up finish in a PBA major event without a victory.  Overall, Shafer has made the TV finals in a PBA major event 10 times and has yet to win.
 The event moved from late season to become the season-opening tournament in 2008–09, meaning there were two World Championships during calendar year 2008.
 With his victory in the November 2008 World Championship, Norm Duke became the first PBA bowler to win three consecutive majors.
 The event was moved again for the 2009–10 season.  In a split-format, the qualifying for the championship was held at the PBA World Series of Bowling in early September 2009, and the TV finals aired live from Wichita, KS on December 13, 2009. In the feel-good story of the season, recently laid-off auto worker Tom Smallwood won the 2009 event.
 Earl Anthony holds the most World Championship victories (called the PBA National Championship at the time), winning the tournament an unprecedented six times. The runner-ups to this feat are Walter Ray Williams Jr., Norm Duke, and Jason Belmonte, all winning this title three times. Anthony's six victories are also the most by any player for any major tournament.
 Jason Belmonte won the 2019 PBA World Championship for his record-setting 11th career major championship, surpassing Earl Anthony and Pete Weber, who each have ten majors.
 Jason Belmonte won three consecutive PBA World Championships in 2017, 2019, and 2020 (the PBA World Championship was not held in the 2018 calendar year), being the second bowler to accomplish this feat, following Anthony.

Tournament of Champions

Current defending champion:  Jason Belmonte

 The Tournament of Champions has had many sponsors over the years; most notably the Firestone Tire and Rubber Company from 1962 to 1993. It is the only PBA major tournament that is not open to all PBA members; the starting field only includes a set number of players who won a recent PBA title or (currently) past winners of the TOC event itself.
 Hall of Famer Joe Joseph captured the first Tournament of Champions crown in 1962. The starting field for that event featured all 25 PBA Tour title winners to date.
 Billy Hardwick won the second Tournament of Champions in 1965, besting finalists Dick Weber and Joe Joseph in a two-game set, 484–468–404.  This was the first tourney in PBA history to offer a six-figure prize fund, along with a then-record $25,000 first prize ($215,000 in 2021 dollars). Following this season, the Tournament of Champions became an annual event.
 Mike Durbin (1972, 1982, and 1984), and Jason Couch (1999, 2000, and 2002) each hold the wins in the Tournament of Champions three times. Jason Couch's three victories came in three consecutive Tournament of Champions (the event was not held in 2001).
 Jason Belmonte holds the most wins in the Tournament of Champions at four (2014, 2015, 2019, and 2023).
 Jack Biondolillo rolled the PBA's first-ever televised 300 game at the 1967 Tournament of Champions.
 George Pappas became the first bowler to lead a major tournament wire-to-wire (from opening game of qualifying to championship match) when he won the 1979 event.
 The 1981 edition saw the only double two-frame roll-off in championship round history, with Pete Couture finally emerging victorious over Earl Anthony in the second roll-off.  Steve Cook won the championship with a memorable 287 game over Couture, gaining the first ten strikes before leaving the 6-7 split.
 Kelly Kulick's win in 2010 made her the first woman ever to win any event on the PBA Tour that was also open to men.
 The 2011 Tournament of Champions featured a $1 million purse and a $250,000 first prize (won by Mika Koivuniemi), making it the richest PBA tournament ever. This event also featured the lowest score ever bowled in a televised PBA event (100, by Tom Daugherty) and the largest pin differential in a PBA final round match, with Koivuniemi defeating Daugherty 299–100 in the semifinal game.
 Pete Weber's victory in the 2013 event made him the oldest player (50 years, 7 months, 10 days) to win the Tournament of Champions, and the only player to win each event of the PBA's Triple Crown at least twice in a career.
 Jesper Svensson of Sweden became the youngest Tournament of Champions winner, capturing the title in the 2016 event at age 20 years, 357 days. This distinction previously belonged to Marshall Holman, who won the 1976 ToC at age 21.

United States Open

Current defending champion: E. J. Tackett

 The origins of the U.S. Open pre-date the PBA's founding by more than a decade, starting in the 1940s.  Originally associated with the Bowling Proprietors Association of America (BPAA) it was known as the BPAA All Star from 1951 to 1970. It was renamed the BPAA United States Open in 1971, and shortened to U.S. Open thereafter.  It has been held every year since, except for 1997 and 2014.
 Like the USBC Masters, the U.S. Open allows amateur bowlers to participate as well as professionals. However, winners must be full-fledged PBA members to be credited with a PBA title.
 The U.S. Open is considered the most difficult of the tournaments bowl in today, due to its long format and demanding oil pattern, which differs from the oil patterns the PBA generally employs. According to PBA.com, the U.S. Open uses a "flat" oil pattern, with equal amounts of oil being applied to every board. (Normal lane conditions feature a "crown" or larger amount of oil over the middle lane boards, to handle the heavier ball traffic.)
 Don Carter dominated the early BPAA All-Star events, winning four times between 1953 and 1958. Dick Weber also won this tournament four times when it was the BPAA All-Star (1962, 1963, 1965 and 1966). Because Weber's wins were all during the PBA era (after 1959), he was retroactively credited with PBA major titles for all four due to a PBA rule change in 2008.
 Mike Limongello won the first modern-day U.S. Open in 1971, defeating Teata Semiz.
 Marshall Holman became the first multiple modern-day winner with victories in 1981 and 1985.
 The purse for the 1987 event, sponsored by Seagram Wine Coolers, was a then-record $500,000, with a record $100,000 going to the eventual winner, Del Ballard Jr.
 The final round of the 1995 event, at Joe Louis Arena in Detroit, set a bowling attendance record with 7,212 watching Dave Husted notch the second of his three U.S. Open Crowns. Husted was also the last person to successfully defend a U.S. Open championship, winning again in 1996.
 Pete Weber holds the record for most victories in the U.S. Open, capturing the title five times (1988, 1991, 2004, 2007, and 2012). He is also the only player to win a U.S. Open championship in four different decades.
 Earl Anthony, who is tied with Pete Weber for the second most PBA major titles (10), never captured the U.S. Open despite runner-up finishes in 1973, 1979 and 1980.
 Norm Duke's victory in the 2008 U.S. Open made him the fifth Triple Crown winner (and second "grand slam" winner) in PBA history.
 The 2014 event was cancelled due to lack of sponsorship and conflicts with the PBA's schedule. The 2015 tournament was originally cancelled as well, but a deal was struck to keep the tournament on the schedule for 2015, 2016, and 2017. Since 2015, the U.S. Open has been jointly run by the USBC and BPAA.
 Canadian François Lavoie bowled the first televised 300 game ever in a U.S. Open in the semifinal match of the 2016 event. This match was Lavoie's television debut during his rookie season in the PBA. He would go on to win in the title match against Marshall Kent to capture his first PBA title, helping him win the 2016 PBA Harry Golden Rookie of the Year award.
 Jason Belmonte's 2020 U.S. Open win made him the PBA's second Super Slam, third Grand Slam, and seventh Triple Crown winner.
 Should he collect another U.S. Open title, Jason Belmonte would become the second player in PBA history to win two Triple Crowns in his career (winning the World Championship, Tournament of Champions and the U.S. Open at least twice each; Pete Weber was the first to do so); he would also accomplish an unprecedented double Super Slam title, which has never been done in PBA history.

PBA Players Championship 

Current defending champion: Jason Belmonte

 Unlike the US Open and USBC Masters, which allow qualifying amateurs to participate, the PBA Players Championship is open to PBA members only.
 The tournament, originally called the PBA Touring Players Championship, was first held in 1983 and would be held every season through 2000. The event would not be held during the 2001 through 2010 seasons. The event, now called the PBA Players Championship, would return as a non-major event in 2011, 2013, and 2015. The Players Championship would return to major status in 2016, and has been held every season since. Jason Belmonte, Scott Norton, and Parker Bohn III would be retroactively awarded major titles in 2016 for their wins in 2011, 2013, and 2015, respectively.
 PBA Hall of Famer Steve Cook won the first PBA Touring Players Championship in 1983.
 Mike Aulby's victory in the 1996 PBA Touring Players Championship allowed him to become the first bowler in PBA history to win the PBA career "Super Slam" (all five majors).
 Graham Fach's victory in the 2016 PBA Players Championship made him the first Canadian bowler to win a PBA Tour Title.
 With his victory in the 2019 PBA Players Championship, Anthony Simonsen became the youngest bowler to win two major titles (22 years, 11 days).
 Dave Ferraro (1988 and 1991), Steve Hoskins (1997 and 1999), Dennis Horan Jr. (1998 and 2000), and Jason Belmonte (2011, 2017, and 2022) all hold multiple victories in the Players Championship; Belmonte is the only player in PBA history to win this event three times.
 The revamped 2021 PBA Players Championship was initially held in five regions around the USA, with the five regional winners then competing in the February 21 televised finals. Kyle Troup won the title and record-tying $250,000 first prize.
 Jason Belmonte's 2022 victory made him the first player in PBA history to win four different majors each on three separate occasions (2013-15 Masters; '14, '15, and '19 T.o.C.; '17, '19, and '20 World Championship; '11, '17, and '22 Players Championship).

PBA Triple Crown
The three "original" major championships (PBA World Championship, Tournament of Champions and U.S. Open) make up the PBA's "Triple Crown."

Only nine bowlers in the history of the PBA have won all three jewels of the Triple Crown in their careers:

 Billy Hardwick
 Johnny Petraglia
 Pete Weber
 Mike Aulby
 Norm Duke
 Chris Barnes
 Jason Belmonte
 Dom Barrett
 E. J. Tackett
Of the nine, Pete Weber is the only player to have won each Triple Crown event at least twice in his career (five U.S. Opens, two PBA World Championships, and two Tournament of Champions titles). Despite 47 and 43 titles respectively, Walter Ray Williams and Earl Anthony are not Triple Crown winners. As mentioned, Anthony never won the U.S. Open, though he finished runner-up in the event three times. Williams has never won the Tournament of Champions, but he has a runner-up finish there.

PBA Grand Slam
Mike Aulby, Norm Duke, and Jason Belmonte are the three of the nine PBA "Triple Crown" winners who have also won the ABC/USBC Masters, thus giving them the unofficial "grand slam" of pro bowling.

Don Carter is also noted for having won all four possible "majors" during his career (PBA National Championship, BPAA All-Star, World Invitational and ABC Masters), however some of these were not PBA events.

PBA Super Slam
Mike Aulby and Jason Belmonte are the only bowlers to have won the PBA "super slam", which includes a win in all four "grand slam" events in addition to a PBA Players Championship title (known as the Touring Players Championship at the time of Aulby's win).

Most majors in PBA history 

*WC/NC = PBA World Championship (2002–present) / PBA National Championship (until 2001-02)

**US/AS = U.S. Open (1971–present) / BPAA All Star (1951–70)

+ = Includes four BPAA All-Star wins earned before the PBA era.

Bold = denotes leader in individual major

PBA Tour in the media

The PBA provided its first televised event in 1962, and became a Saturday afternoon staple on the ABC schedule from 1965.

In its heyday, ABC's Professional Bowlers Tour outranked all sporting events on Saturdays with the exception of some college football telecasts.

On March 21, 2018, the PBA announced that Fox Sports signed a multi-year agreement to acquire the television rights to its events beginning in 2019. Most events will be carried by the Fox Sports 1 cable network, but at least four events per season will air on the broadcast Fox network.

Televised conversions of the "impossible splits"
Mark Roth, whose first career title was captured at the 1975 PBA King Louie Open in Overland Park, Kansas by rolling a televised 299 game against Steve Jones, gained immortality by becoming the first bowler to convert the almost-impossible 7–10 split (or "bedposts") on national television in the first match of the ARC Alameda Open on January 5, 1980. In 1991, both John Mazza and Jess Stayrook accomplished this feat on television. Nearly 30 years later, 18-year old rookie Anthony Neuer became the fourth PBA player to convert the 7–10 split on television, doing so in the semifinal match of the 2021 U.S. Open against Jakob Butturff.

Even rarer than a 7–10 split conversion, the 4–6–7–10, or the "Big Four," though statistically easier than the 7–10, has only been made once in the Tour's television history, by Walter Ray Williams Jr. at the 2005 PBA Atlanta Classic against Ryan Shafer.

Perfect and near-perfect televised games
There have been 34 perfect games bowled in nationally televised title events on the PBA Tour. Seven have been rolled in major tournaments, including the first by Jack Biondolillo at the 1967 PBA Firestone Tournament of Champions against Les Schissler. The most recent was accomplished by Jason Belmonte, who rolled the PBA Tour's 34th televised 300 game on June 5, 2022 against Dom Barrett at the 2022 PBA Tour Finals.  Four of the 34 perfect games (5th, 6th, 27th, and 34th) have been bowled in title matches; the first by Bob Benoit at the 1988 PBA Quaker State Open against Mark Roth, the second by Mike Aulby at the 1993 PBA Wichita Open against David Ozio, the third by Tommy Jones at the 2020 PBA Hall of Fame Classic against Darren Tang, and the fourth by Jason Belmonte at the 2022 PBA Tour Finals against Dom Barrett. Sean Rash was the first player to roll more than one 300 game in televised PBA Tour events, as he owns the 23rd and 25th perfect games overall; the first at the 2014 PBA Bear Open against Chris Loschetter, and the second at the 2015 PBA Barbasol Tournament of Champions against Ryan Ciminelli. François Lavoie (26th and 29th televised 300 games), Chris Via (30th and 32nd televised 300 games) and Jason Belmonte (21st and 34th televised 300 games) have since joined Rash in this exclusive club, with Via being the only one of the four to roll both of his televised 300 games in the same season (2021). The 2022 PBA Tour Finals saw the first ever occurrence of multiple televised 300 games being bowled on the same broadcast, with Kyle Troup and Jason Belmonte scoring the 33rd and 34th televised 300 games, respectfully. There have also been two perfect games on Senior PBA Tour telecasts, by Gene Stus in 1992 and Ron Winger in 1993.

Three other players have shot multiple televised 300 games in PBA events, but at least one of the perfect games was rolled in a non-title event broadcast. Ryan Shafer, who owns the 19th televised PBA Tour 300, shot a second 300 game in a singles match at the non-title 2011 GEICO PBA Team shootout. Chris Barnes, owner of the PBA Tour's 22nd televised 300 game, also scored 300 in the 2015 DHC PBA Japan Cup, but his feat was only broadcast on Japanese television. Barnes has also rolled a 300 game on European television, at the 2014 QubicaAMF World Cup. Wes Malott rolled two 300 games in the 2009 PBA King of Bowling series, a televised non-title event featuring PBA players.

Of several 299 games that were bowled on televised championships, the most memorable occurred on April 4, 1970, when Don Johnson defeated Dick Ritger to win the 1970 PBA Firestone Tournament of Champions at Riviera Lanes in Fairlawn, Ohio. With 11 strikes already down, he threw his 12th ball, stepped back and dropped to the floor. The ball hit flush in the pocket, but the 10-pin remained standing. Johnson, still on the floor, briefly lowered his face into his hands, then stood up to a thunderous ovation. Johnson's wife Mary Anne was in tears of joy prior to the shot, and even more so after Johnson got up from the floor. Along with the champion's trophy and $25,000 check from Firestone, Johnson also received and got to keep the pin that stood in the 10 position and denied him both an extra $10,000 and a brand-new 1970 Mercury Cougar for a 300 game (In the post-match interview with the Johnsons, Mary Anne was holding the pin). The footage of this has been replayed many dozens of times in flashback segments on PBA telecasts. The online bowling channel FloBowling has named this the most memorable moment of the event's history.

Jason Sterner, out of Rochester, New York, also has a televised 299 game in a title match to his credit. This happened at the 2013 PBA Don Carter Classic, when Sterner defeated Wes Malott for the title, leaving a vicious ringing 10 pin on his final shot in the 10th.

The 2011 Tournament of Champions event saw both a 299 game and the highest ever gap between winner and loser (199 pins). Tom Daugherty bowled a score of 100, the lowest ever in a televised PBA match. Handling the situation wonderfully, he circled the front row of the audience and celebrated while receiving a standing ovation. Mika Koivuniemi, who had previously posted the PBA's 17th televised 300 at the 2003 PBA Cambridge Credit Classic against Jason Couch in the wildcard match, finished next and bowled 299, dropping to the floor and laying on his back after the head pin bounced from the left sideboard and rolled over to the 10-pin (what is often dubbed a "messenger"), but the 10 did not fall. Koivuniemi also received a standing ovation, but unlike Don Johnson, who bowled his 299 in the championship match, Mika threw his 299 in the semifinal match.

The following is a list of all perfect 300 games in nationally televised PBA Tour title events (PBA Hall of Famers marked with an asterisk; major tournaments in bold text):

See also
Professional Bowlers Tour - ABC telecast aired from 1962 to 1997.
PBA Regional Tour
PBA Women's Series
PBA Senior Tour
World Bowling Tour

References and footnotes

External links

 
Ten-pin bowling
Bowling organizations
Sports in Akron, Ohio
Sports in Seattle
Professional sports leagues in the United States